Vicente Villafañe is a former Negro league third baseman who played in the 1940s.

Villafañe played for the Indianapolis Clowns in 1947. In eight recorded games, he posted eight hits and two RBI in 29 plate appearances.

References

External links
 and Seamheads

Year of birth missing
Place of birth missing
Indianapolis Clowns players
Baseball third basemen